The Pall Mall Stakes was a prestigious greyhound racing competition held at Oxford Stadium until it closed in 2012. It was run at Harringay Stadium from 1935 until 1987, before moving to Oxford Stadium in 1988.   

The race never received the status of a classic race in but was classified as a category one race. At Oxford it was held during the month of March and was considered to be a good guide for the upcoming English Greyhound Derby because it attracted many Derby prospects.

Past winners

Discontinued

Track & race distances
1935-1974 Harringay Stadium 525 yards
1935-1987 Harringay Stadium 475 metres
1988-2012 Oxford Stadium 450 metres

Sponsors
1990-1990 Hawkins of Harrow
1991-1993 Max Thomas Bookmakers
1994-1994 Arthur Young Bookmakers
1995-1995 Tetley Bitter
1996-2001 Arthur Young Bookmakers
2002-2009 William Hill
2010-2010 Stan James
2011-2011 Betfair

References

Greyhound racing competitions in the United Kingdom
Sport in Oxfordshire
Sport in the London Borough of Haringey
Recurring sporting events established in 1935
Greyhound racing in London